Natalia Andreyevna O'Shea (née Nikolayeva, known as Hellawes, ; born 3 September 1976) is a Russian harpist, singer-songwriter, linguist and band leader of Melnitsa (folk-rock),  (traditional Celtic folk) and Romanesque (folk). Earlier she took part in the Till Eulenspiegel project (folk), for which she was a vocalist, author and co-author of many songs.

Biography
O'Shea is a linguist, and expert in Indo-European languages especially Celtic languages. She is also a PhD of philological science and was an instructor in Lomonosov Moscow State University. Earlier she worked in Trinity College in Dublin (Ireland). Natalia has been living and working in Ireland (Dublin) and in Switzerland (Geneva) since 2004, but periodically she returns in Russia to take part in concerts of "Melnitsa", "Clann Lir" or in solo concerts.

O'Shea has been appearing on the stage since 1998. She is one of the most popular folk-rock singers on the Russian scene and cult author-performer in the youth (and especially in student) midst of Moscow, Saint-Petersburg and other cities. Also she is a very popular singer for the players of role-playing game movement.

The Hellawes's songs have spread through the Internet and have won recognition of listeners long ago in many cities of Russia and outside.

Personal life
Nikolayeva married James Cornelius O'Shea, an Irish citizen, who was a member of staff at the Irish Embassy in Moscow on 21 August 2004, and on 22 July 2008 Natalia O'Shea gave birth to a daughter, Nina Caitríona O'Shea, in Geneva (Switzerland). 15 April 2011 she gave birth to their second daughter, Úna Tamar.

Discography

Hellawes 
 Running to Paradise (Melanar, 1996)
 Дорога сна (The Road of Dream) 1996
 Лунный день (The Lunar Day) (Melanar, 1996)
 Сольные записи (The Solo Album) 1999
 Леопард в городе (Leopard in the City) (2009)
 Новые ботинки (The New Boots) (2013)

Melnitsa
 Дорога сна (The Road Of Dream) (2003)
 Master of the Mill (2004)
 Перевал (Mountain Pass) (2005)
 Зов крови (Call of the Blood) (2006)
 The Best (2007)
 Дикие травы (Herbs) (2009)
 Ангелофрения (Angelophrenia) (2012)
 Алхимия (Alchemy) (2015)
 Химера (Chimera) (2016)
 2.0 (2019)
 Манускрипт (Manuscript) (2021)

References

External links
 Helavisa.ru (official website)
Brief Biography

1976 births
Moscow State University alumni
Living people
Celtic studies scholars
Russian folk musicians
Linguists from Russia
Women linguists
Russian harpists
Folk rock musicians